Ministry of Energy Transition and Sustainable Developmentt is a Moroccan Ministry charged with implementing national strategies in the fields of geology, minerals, hydrocarbons and energies, and building the necessary human competencies in these fields.

Institutions affiliated with the Ministry 
The Ministry of Energy, Mines and Environment supervises many institutions related to the Ministry's responsibilities:

 National Office of Electricity and Drinking Water
 OCP Group
 Energy Investment Company (SIE)
 Moroccan Agency for Sustainable Energy (MASEN)
 National Office of Hydrocarbons and Minerals
 Institute for Research in Solar Energy and New Energies (IRESEN)
 Moroccan Agency for Energy Efficiency (AMEE)
 Moroccan Agency for Security and Safety in the Nuclear and Radiation Fields (AMSENOR)
 National Center for Energy, Science and nuclear Techniques 
 Minerals Institute Marrakech
 Higher National School for Minerals in Rabat

See also 

 Government of Morocco

References

External links 
 Website

Government ministries of Morocco